This is a list of antiandrogens, or drugs that prevent the effects of androgens like testosterone and dihydrotestosterone (DHT). It includes direct antagonists of the androgen receptor (AR), androgen synthesis inhibitors like 5α-reductase inhibitors and CYP17A1 inhibitors, and antigonadotropins like  analogues, estrogens, and progestogens. In addition, it includes both steroidal antiandrogen (SAAs) and nonsteroidal antiandrogen (NSAAs). Only antiandrogens that have been marketed are included in this list.

Androgen receptor antagonists

Steroidal antiandrogens

 17α-Hydroxyprogesterone derivatives
 Chlormadinone acetate
 Cyproterone acetate
 Megestrol acetate
 Osaterone acetate
 19-Norprogesterone derivatives
 Nomegestrol acetate
 19-Nortestosterone derivatives
 Dienogest
 Oxendolone
 17α-Spirolactone derivatives
 Drospirenone
 Spironolactone
 Others
 Medrogestone

Note that in addition to acting as AR antagonists, most SAAs also act as potent progestogens and therefore antigonadotropins.

Note that this list does not include pure progestogens, only SAAs also acting as AR antagonists.

Nonsteroidal antiandrogens

 First-generation
 Bicalutamide
 Flutamide
 Nilutamide
 Second-generation
 Apalutamide
 Darolutamide
 Enzalutamide
 Proxalutamide
 Others/non-generational
 Cimetidine
 Topilutamide

Note that, in contrast to most SAAs, NSAAs are pure/selective AR antagonists with no antigonadotropic activity.

Androgen synthesis inhibitors

CYP17A1 inhibitors

 Abiraterone acetate
 Ketoconazole
 Seviteronel

CYP11A1 (P450scc) inhibitors
 Aminoglutethimide

5α-Reductase inhibitors

 Alfatradiol
 Dutasteride
 Epristeride
 Finasteride
 Saw palmetto extract

These drugs selectively inhibit the synthesis of DHT without affecting that of testosterone.

Antigonadotropins

 Estrogens (e.g., estradiol (and its esters), ethinylestradiol, conjugated estrogens, diethylstilbestrol)
 GnRH analogues
 GnRH agonists (e.g., goserelin, leuprorelin)
 GnRH antagonists (e.g., cetrorelix)
 Progestogens (e.g., chlormadinone acetate, cyproterone acetate, gestonorone caproate, medroxyprogesterone acetate, megestrol acetate)

See also
 List of androgens/anabolic steroids

References

Antiandrogens